The 2007 Lexus Cup was a golf event competed by women representing Asia and an International squad representing the rest of the world. Each team was made up of twelve members. The competition took place at The Vines Resort & Country Club in Perth, Australia from 7–9 December 2007. Lexus was the title sponsor; Rolex, DBS, Singapore Airlines and Singapore Sports Council were main sponsors.

After taking a commanding lead in the first day of play, winning all six matches, Team Asia won the tournament by a score of 15 to 9.

Teams
As in the similar team events of the Solheim Cup (USA vs. Europe women), Ryder Cup (USA vs. Europe men), and Presidents Cup (USA vs. "International" men, i.e. rest of the world excluding Europe), each team was made up of twelve players.

Asia

Rolex World Ranking Qualification
 Se Ri Pak (captain) – Daejeon, South Korea
 Jeong Jang – Daejeon, South Korea
 Jee Young Lee – Seoul, South Korea
 Jiyai Shin – South Korea
ADT Official Money List Qualification
 Shi Hyun Ahn – Seoul, South Korea
 In-Kyung Kim – South Korea
 Sarah Lee – Seoul, South Korea
 Seon Hwa Lee – Cheonan, South Korea
Captain's Picks
 Meena Lee – Jeonju, South Korea
 Amy Hung – Kaohsiung, Taiwan
Sponsor's Picks
 Candie Kung – Kaohsiung, Taiwan
 Ayako Uehara – Kagoshima, Japan

International
Rolex World Rankings Qualifications
 Annika Sörenstam (captain) – Stockholm, Sweden
 Cristie Kerr – Scottsdale, Arizona
 Suzann Pettersen – Oslo, Norway
 Morgan Pressel – Boca Raton, Florida
ADT Official Money List Qualification
 Natalie Gulbis – Sacramento, California
 Maria Hjorth – Falun, Sweden
 Brittany Lincicome – St. Petersburg, Florida
 Angela Park – Foz do Iguaçu, Brazil
Captain's Picks
 Nikki Campbell – Coventry, Australia
 Stacy Prammanasudh – Enid, Oklahoma
Sponsor's Picks
 Nicole Castrale – Palm Desert, California
 Catriona Matthew – Edinburgh, Scotland

Day one
7 December 2007

Day one saw six foursome matches with each team putting two golfers on the course for each match, with the pairs playing alternate shots.  Team Asia took a commanding lead in the Lexus Cup, winning all six matches. Only one of the six matches—Sarah Lee and Meena Lee vs. Cristie Kerr and Nicole Castrale went to 18 holes.

Day two
8 December 2007

The teams competed in four ball competition on day two. Team Asia continued to dominate, increasing its lead to seven points. Team International posted its first points of the week with wins by partners Angela Park and Nikki Campbell, and by Cristie Kerr and Nicole Castrale.

Day three
9 December 2007

Prior to the start of Day Three, it was announced that Suzann Pettersen had withdrawn from the singles matches due to a back injury. Pak, who had been battling a shoulder injury also sat out and the two captains agreed to halve the Pak-Pettersen match.

References

External links
Lexus Cup – official site

Lexus Cup
Golf tournaments in Australia
Lexus Cup
Lexus Cup
Lexus Cup